Lester Ryan (born January 8, 1993) is a Montserratian sprinter who specializes in the 100 metres, 200 metres and 4 x 100 metres relay. He represented Montserrat in the 100 metres, 200 metres and 4 x 100 metres relay at the 2014 Commonwealth Games in Glasgow, Scotland.

References

External links

1993 births
Living people
Montserratian male sprinters
Commonwealth Games competitors for Montserrat
Athletes (track and field) at the 2014 Commonwealth Games
Athletes (track and field) at the 2018 Commonwealth Games